Vendeuvre-sur-Barse (literally Vendeuvre on Barse) is a commune in the Aube department in north-central France.

Geography
The Barse has its source in the commune, under the chateau.

Population

See also
 Communes of the Aube department
 Parc naturel régional de la Forêt d'Orient

References

Communes of Aube
Aube communes articles needing translation from French Wikipedia